Alfie Sams (10 November 1911 – 1990) was an English professional footballer who played in the Football League for Mansfield Town and Reading.

References

1911 births
1990 deaths
English footballers
Association football forwards
English Football League players
Whitby Town F.C. players
Shildon A.F.C. players
Grantham Town F.C. players
Mansfield Town F.C. players
Reading F.C. players
Accrington Stanley F.C. (1891) players